Horace Carpenter may refer to:

 Horace B. Carpenter (1875–1945), American actor, film director and screenwriter
 Horace Thompson Carpenter (1857–1947), American illustrator, artist and art writer
 Horace Carpenter (priest) (1887–1965), British priest